Dennis Edlund (born 24 September 1965) is a Swedish professional golfer.

Edlund was born in Strängnäs and turned professional in 1988. He played on the European Tour and its official development tour, the Challenge Tour, between 1990 and 2003. He won five times on the Challenge Tour, including twice in 1996, when he won the English Challenge Tour Championship and Rolex Trophy Pro-Am on his way to second place on the tour's end of season rankings. His best finishes on the European Tour were as runner-up at both the 1997 Alamo English Open and the 1998 Standard Life Loch Lomond.

Amateur wins
1987 Biarittz Cup (France)

Professional wins (7)

Challenge Tour wins (5)

Swedish Golf Tour wins (1)

Other wins (1)
2007 Älvkarleby Open (Swedish mini-tour)

Team appearances
Amateur
European Amateur Team Championship (representing Sweden): 1987

See also
List of golfers with most Challenge Tour wins

References

External links

Swedish male golfers
European Tour golfers
Sportspeople from Södermanland County
People from Strängnäs Municipality
1965 births
Living people